Ismail Ahmed Abdelmoneim (born September 23, 1976), also known as Somaa, is an Egyptian-Lebanese professional basketball player for Al Riyadi Club Beirut of the Lebanese Basketball League. He was a main member of the Egypt national basketball team that participated in the FIBA Africa Championship 2001 in Casablanca in Morocco and in the FIBA Africa Championship 2003 that took place in Alexandria, Egypt. He is nicknamed "The Egyptian Pharaoh".

Career
Ahmad began his professional career in 1993, when he was 17 and made his debut on Al Ittihad Alexandria of the Egyptian Basketball Super League. In 1996, he traveled to Lebanon to participate in the Arab Club Basketball Championship. He led the team to the championship beating Lebanese Sagesse Beirut.

He was loaned from Wardia to play with Sagesse Beirut in the Arab Club Championship in 1998. Ahmad played a historic role in the team title scoring 21 points in the final. He was the second player with an Arab surname and the first with the Lebanese team.

After the Rosary, he played in 1999 under the leadership of the Egyptian coach Azmi Sharif before returning to Egypt to play with Ittihad. He then returned to Lebanon from Champville gate in 2002. In the summer of 2002, Ahmad went to the United States to play for the Houston Rockets in the NBA Summer League, and then the Miami Heat the following year.

On September 22, 2017, he signed with Homenetmen. After one season, he returned to Al Riyadi where he stayed for two more seasons.

In January 2020, Ahmad returned to Al Ittihad Alexandria after 13 years. In his first season he won the 2019–20 Egyptian Basketball Super League and was named the league's Most Valuable Player (MVP). Ahmad also won two Egyptian Cups (in 2020 and 2021) with the team. After the season was suspended due to the COVID-19 pandemic, Ahmad agreed to a 50% salary cut with Ittihad.

On May 17, 2022, Ahmad joined Al Riyadi Beirut for the final stage of the Lebanese Basketball League.

National team career
Ahmad has represented the Egypt national basketball team and has won the African Games three times. He also won three bronze medals at the FIBA AfroBasket tournaments.

Awards and accomplishments

Club
Al Ittihad Alexandria
 Egyptian Basketball Premier League (x3) : 1994–95, 1995–96, 2019–20
 Egypt Basketball Cup (x2) : 2019–20, 2020–21
 Arab Club Basketball Championship (x4) : 1995, 1996, 2002, 2019
Sagesse Beirut
 Arab Club Basketball Championship (x1) : 1998

Al Riyadi Beirut
 Lebanese Basketball League (x12) : 2005–2011, 2014–2017, 2019
 Lebanese Basketball Cup (x4) : 2006–2008, 2019
 FIBA Asia Champions Cup - Gold Medalist (x1) : 2011
 WABA Champions Cup (x2) : 2008, 2011
 Arab Club Basketball Championship (x5): 2005, 2006, 2007, 2009, 2010

Champville SC
 Lebanese Basketball Cup (x1): 2004

Homenetmen Beirut BC
 Arab Club Basketball Championship (x1): 2017
 Lebanese Basketball League (x1): 2018
 Lebanese Basketball Cup (x1): 2018

Egypt
Egypt National Team
 FIBA Africa Championship - Bronze Medalist (x2) : 2001, 2003
 All African Games 2007
 Qualifying to FIFA World Youth Championship in 1997

Individual
Egyptian Basketball Super League MVP Award: (2020)

References

External links 
 Player profile at www.Asia-Basket.com (subscription required)

1976 births
Living people
Egyptian men's basketball players
Sportspeople from Alexandria
Centers (basketball)
Power forwards (basketball)
Sagesse SC basketball players
Al Riyadi Club Beirut basketball players
Al Ittihad Alexandria Club basketball players
Champville SC players